The Hong Kong Federation of Trade Unions  (HKFTU) is a pro-Beijing labour and political group established in 1948 in Hong Kong. It is the oldest and largest labour group in Hong Kong with over 420,000 members in 253 affiliates and associated trade unions. Presided by Ng Chau-pei and chaired by Kingsley Wong, it currently holds four seats in the Legislative Council and five seats in the District Councils.

The HKFTU has long been seen as a satellite organisation of the Chinese Communist Party (CCP), the ruling party of the People's Republic of China (PRC). It played a leading role in the 1967 riots against British rule in Hong Kong, which were suppressed by the colonial government. In the 1980s, the HKFTU, along with the conservative business elites, led efforts against faster democratisation during the run up to the Chinese resumption of sovereignty over Hong Kong in 1997.

HKFTU trade unionists were among the founding members of the Democratic Alliance for the Betterment of Hong Kong (DAB) in 1992, which has become the flagship pro-Beijing party today. In the early 2010s, the HKFTU began actively participating in elections under its own banner with a more pro-grassroots and pro-labour platform, distant from the DAB's pro-middle-class and professionals outlook, in order to broaden the pro-Beijing electorate.

Policies
The HKFTU's motto is "patriotism, solidarity, rights, welfare and participation". The group focuses on the rights and welfare of workers, supporting workers in their negotiations with employers and helping them resolve labour disputes. It works to amend legislation to protect labour rights and prevent employers from exploiting loopholes in labour laws. It opposes immigrant labour and calls for legislation against age discrimination.

Politically, the HKFTU has been described as left-wing and socialist, but also conversely as pro-business and conservative. It supports the governments of the People's Republic of China and Hong Kong Special Administrative Region, and is affiliated with the All-China Federation of Trade Unions. It allied with the Hong Kong government on many issues but has a pro-grassroots stance on livelihood and labour issues, such as demanding more measures to reduce unemployment. Due to its government loyalist nature, industrial militancy has been remarkably absent from the HKFTU's action programme.

The HKFTU also operates five retail outlets which provide discounted goods and services to its members. Businesses include catering, credit card facilities, medical services, and travel agencies.

History

Early years
The Hong Kong Federation of Trade Unions was founded by pro-CCP trade unionists in 1948 as the Hong Kong and Kowloon Federation of Trade Unions. At the same time, the pro-Kuomintang Hong Kong and Kowloon Trades Union Council (TUC) was set up as a rival organisation. This was all done in the midst of the Chinese Civil War between the Communists and Nationalists in Mainland China. The HKFTU was registered as non-union "friendly societies" under the Societies Ordinance in order to avoid the restrictive provision in the newly introduced Trade Union Registration Ordinance of 1948.

During the 1950s and 1960s, the HKFTU functioned as industrially based "friendly societies" or craft-based fraternities and provided benefits and other supplementary aids to the veteran members who was under the threats of unemployment and low pay. It contested with the TUC in industries, trades, and workplaces under the left-right ideological divide of that period.

The relations between the HKFTU and the colonial government remained tense. Union activities were under strict regulation by the government. Inspired by the Cultural Revolution, the HKFTU escalated labour disputes into the 1967 riots against British colonial rule. Many labour activists and HKFTU cadres were imprisoned and deported. Due to its campaign of violence and bomb attacks, the HKFTU suffered serious setbacks in both public esteem and official tolerance. During the riots, the HKFTU also boycotted participation in any officially appointed consultative bodies by the colonial government until Beijing's Communist government adopted economic reforms in the late 1970s.

Transition to 1997
In the background of the 1980s, amidst shifts in the political economy of mainland China and negotiations on Hong Kong's political status after 1997, the HKFTU readjusted its policy toward the colonial government. The electoral reform introduced by the government also gave trade unions access to political power. In the first Legislative Council election in 1985, candidates from the HKFTU and the TUC ran uncontested in the two newly created seats in the Labour functional constituency. One such candidate was Tam Yiu-chung of the HKFTU, who served as the member of the Legislative Council for the Labour functional constituency until 1995, when he was succeeded by Cheng Yiu-tong.

On the other hand, as the most massive grassroots organ of the pro-Beijing bloc, the HKFTU also led efforts to resist the pre-1997 attempts at democratisation. It opposed the possible direct Legislative Council election of 1988 with the slogan, "Hong Kong workers only want meal tickets, not electoral ballots." However, during the Hong Kong Basic Law drafting process from 1985 to 1990, the HKFTU had to repudiate its demands on the rights to union recognition and collective bargaining in the Consultative and Drafting Committees dominated by tycoons. The HKFTU's devotion to Beijing and its collaboration with the conservative business interests were challenged by some leftist unionists.

In the beginning of the 1990s, the HKFTU became more involved in politics to counter the growing influence of pro-democracy parties such as the United Democrats of Hong Kong (later transformed into the Democratic Party) and its ally the Hong Kong Confederation of Trade Unions (HKCTU). Chan Yuen-han ran as the HKFTU candidate in the 1991 Legislative Council direct election but was defeated by Lau Chin-shek, a pro-democracy labour activist representing the United Democrats of Hong Kong. In 1992, the first pro-Beijing political party, the Democratic Alliance for the Betterment of Hong Kong (DAB), was co-founded by HKFTU members. HKFTU began mobilising its supporters to vote for DAB candidates in the Legislative Council elections.

Since handover
After the transfer of sovereignty over Hong Kong in 1997, the HKFTU's representatives joined the Beijing-controlled Provisional Legislative Council to roll back several pre-handover labour rights laws passed in spring 1997 by the colonial legislature controlled by the pro-democracy camp, which included the collective bargaining right under the Employee's Rights to Representation, Consultation and Collective Bargaining Ordinance. The Provisional Legislative Council also enacted new electoral rules to disenfranchise some 800,000 blue-, gray- and white-collar workers in the nine functional constituencies created from Chris Patten's electoral reform. The number of eligible voters in the Labour functional constituency was reduced from 2,001 qualified union officials in 1995 to only 361 unions on a one-vote-per-union basis for the first SAR elections in 1998.

The HKFTU has been a vocal supporter of the central government in Beijing and the Hong Kong SAR government; its then-president Cheng Yiu-tong was appointed as a non-official member of the Executive Council from 2002 to 2017. During the early years of the SAR administration, HKFTU members ran in direct elections under the banner of its sister organisation DAB. Since the 2008 Legislative Council elections, HKFTU members Chan Yuen-han and Wong Kwok-hing have run independently from DAB, under a more grassroots and pro-labour rights agenda. In the 2011 District Council election, the HKFTU ran 20 candidates entirely on its own, winning 11 seats. In the 2012 Legislative Council elections, the HKFTU filled candidates in four of the five geographical constituencies and veteran Chan Yuen-han contested in the territory-wide District Council (Second) constituency, becoming the fourth largest political group in the legislature.

In the 2015 District Council election, the HKFTU had 29 candidates elected (two under both DAB and HKFTU banners). Its Legislative Council seats dropped from six to five in the 2016 Legislative Council election as veteran Wong Kwok-hing failed to retain his District Council (Second) seat. Nevertheless, the HKFTU remained the third-largest political group in the 6th Legislative Council (2016–2021).

The HKFTU suffered a major defeat in the 2019 District Council election, which was held amidst the 2019 protests, retaining only five of their previous 26 seats.

In August 2022, after Nancy Pelosi visited Taiwan, the HKFTU staged a protest at the US Consulate General in Hong Kong, and said the United States "must pay full responsibility for playing with fire."

Finances
In August 2018, the pro-democracy tabloid Apple Daily reported that the HKFTU had total assets of about $250 million Hong Kong dollars. From 2015 to 2017, the HKFTU accumulated an income of $380 million, including $242 million from an unknown donor. The HKFTU also allegedly avoided paying $39.2 million in profits tax by transferring $24.7 million to a company.

Election results

Legislative Council elections

Note 1: Each voter got two votes in the 1991 election.

Note 2: Before 2008 the HKFTU had a joint-ticket with DAB.

District Council elections

Leadership

Presidents
 Chan Yiu-choi, 1957–1980
 Yeung Kwong, 1980–1988
 Lee Chark-tim, 1988–2000
 Cheng Yiu-tong, 2000–2012
 Lam Shuk-yee, 2012–2018
 Ng Chau-pei, 2018–present

Chairmen
 Chu King-man, 1948–1949
 Cheung Chun-nam, 1949–1951
 Chan Man-hon, 1951–1954
 Chan Yiu-choi, 1954–1957
 Lee Sang, 1957–1962
 Yeung Kwong, 1962–1980
 Poon Kwong-wai, 1980–1986
 Cheng Yiu-tong, 1986–2000
 Wong Kwok-kin, 2000–2009
 Ng Chau-pei, 2009–2018
 Kingsley Wong, 2018–present

Representatives

Executive Council
 Wong Kwok-kin

Legislative Council

District Councils

National People's Congress
 Cheng Yiu-tong
 Ng Chau-pei

Chinese People’s Political Consultative Conference
 Lam Shuk-yee
 Kingsley Wong

See also

 Macau Federation of Trade Unions, equivalent organisation in Macau
 United Front (China)
 United Front Work Department
 Politics of Hong Kong
 Socialism in Hong Kong

References

Citations

Sources

Books

Journal articles

External links
  

 
Chinese Communist Party
Conservative parties in Hong Kong
Socialist parties in Hong Kong
National trade union centres of Hong Kong
1948 establishments in Hong Kong